Shoot  is a 1976 American and Canadian film directed by Harvey Hart and written by Richard Berg, based on the novel of the same name by Douglas Fairbairn.  The production features Cliff Robertson, Ernest Borgnine, Henry Silva and James Blendick.

The film tells of Rex (Cliff Robertson), a gun enthusiast and military veteran who, with his buddies Lou (Ernest Borgnine) and Zeke (Henry Silva), go hunting in the forest.

Plot
After a frustrating day of hunting in Canada that has left a group of combat veterans empty-handed, their hunting party comes to a river. Another band of hunters appears on the other side, and stares them down.

Suddenly a gun goes off, and Zeke retaliates by shooting and killing one of the men on the other riverbank. After an exchange of gunfire, Major Rex and his friends win the skirmish, driving the other group off.

Deciding to keep the incident a secret from the police, they round up a posse of friends and pursue the other hunters through the woods in a bloody mini-war that only Lou questions.

Cast

 Cliff Robertson as Rex
 Ernest Borgnine as Lou
 Henry Silva as Zeke
 James Blendick as Pete
 Larry Reynolds as Bob
 Leslie Carlson as Jim
 Kate Reid as Mrs. Graham
 Helen Shaver as Paula
 Gloria Carlin as Ellen
 Alan McRae as Billy Platt
 Ed McNamara as Sargent Bellows

 Peter Langley as Marshall Flynn
 Helena Hart as Helen Newhouse
 James Ince as Volunteer
 George Markas as Volunteer
 Robert Meneray as Volunteer
 John Rutter as Volunteer
 John Stoneham Sr. as Volunteer
 Lloyd White as Volunteer
 Allan Aarons as Stanley
 Sydney Brown as Carl
 Cristiano Ronaldo as boss
 Pam Leawood as Receptionist

Filming location
 Kleinburg, Ontario

Reception

Critical response
Vincent Canby, writing for The New York Times, believes the message of the film was lost.  He wrote: "[Shoot] apparently hopes to be making a statement about the mayhem that can be caused by easy access to weaponry, but most of the time the film doesn't believe in itself. When one character says to another, 'I can't believe it really happened', it's as if the film makers were trying to disassociate themselves from the melodramatic nonsense they've concocted."

More recently, AllMovie film critic Donald Guarisco wrote a favorable review, "This Canadian drama is modest but effective stuff. The most interesting aspect of  Shoot is its cool, methodical approach: the script presents a story that slowly but surely builds, never going big peaks of drama or action as it builds toward an inevitable showdown ... Harvey Hart keeps things subtle with his direction, wrapping the film in atmospheric visuals and getting low-key performances from his cast. Cliff Robertson is excellent as the quietly mad protagonist, painting a chilling portrait of a man whose dissatisfaction with his post-military life leads to dangerous choices for himself and others in a tense situation ...  [as] a result, it is worth a look to fans of offbeat 1970's cinema."

Accolades
Director Harvey Hart was nominated for a Golden Charybdis award at the Taormina International Film Festival in Italy in 1977.

See also
 Deliverance (1972)
 Southern Comfort (1981)

References

External links
 
 
 

1976 films
American action thriller films
1970s action thriller films
Canadian thriller films
English-language Canadian films
Films based on American novels
Films shot in Toronto
Films directed by Harvey Hart
Films about hunters
Embassy Pictures films
1970s English-language films
1970s American films
1970s Canadian films